Michael Carmine (March 6, 1959 – October 14, 1989) was an American actor.

Early life 
Carmine was born in Flatbush, Brooklyn. He graduated from the High School of Performing Arts at the age of sixteen, and went on to study acting at the California Institute of the Arts.

Career 
He made his first film appearance as an extra in the disaster film Rollercoaster (1977) and played his first speaking part on Hill Street Blues in 1982. A small role in Brian De Palma's Scarface (1983) was followed by the role of Snake in Michael Mann's television series Miami Vice, which led to his first major role in Mann's Band of the Hand (1986), directed by Paul Michael Glaser.

On stage, Carmine appeared in both Broadway and Off-Broadway productions of Reinaldo Povod's play Cuba and His Teddy Bear. He also played Papo in Povod's La Puta Vida.

Carmine went on to appear in supporting roles in the films Batteries Not Included (1987) and Leviathan (1989). In his final role, he played an AIDS patient in the drama film Longtime Companion (also 1989).

Death 
Carmine died of a heart attack on October 14, 1989. He was 30 years old.

Filmography

Film

Television

References

External links 
 
 
 

1959 births
1989 deaths
20th-century American male actors
AIDS-related deaths in New York (state)
American male film actors
American male stage actors
American male television actors
American people of Puerto Rican descent
Hispanic and Latino American male actors
People from Flatbush, Brooklyn